Piloleiomyomas are a cutaneous condition that present as dermal reddish-brown, pink or skin-colored papules or nodules that can be solitary or multiple.

See also 
 Palisaded encapsulated neuroma
 List of cutaneous conditions

References 

Dermal and subcutaneous growths